Gail Krantzberg is a Professor of Engineering and Public Policy at McMaster University in Hamilton, Ontario, Canada. Her research has focused on plastic pollution in the Great Lakes, and includes detecting COVID-19 in municipal water supplies. In 2001 she was selected to be the director of the International Joint Commission's Great Lakes Office in Windsor, Ontario, a post she held until 2005. In 2021, it was announced that she would co-chair the IJC's Science Priority Committee.

References 

Living people
Year of birth missing (living people)